Marcel Tremblay is a Canadian politician and a City Councillor in Montreal, Quebec. He ran as a Civic Party of Montreal candidate to the City Council in a 1991 by-election in the district of Notre-Dame-de-Grâce but lost.

In the wake of the province-wide Municipal Merger of 2001, Tremblay ran as a candidate for his brother's Gérald Tremblay's Montreal Island Citizens Union in the district De Décarie.  The party is now known as Union Montreal.  Tremblay won the election over Vision Montreal incumbent Sonya Biddle.

He was re-elected in 2005, representing the district of Notre-Dame-de-Grâce.

Instead of seeking his incumbent seat in the 2009 Montreal municipal election, he ran for borough mayor of Villeray–Saint-Michel–Parc-Extension, where he was defeated by Anie Samson of Vision Montréal. His former city council seat was won by Peter McQueen of Projet Montréal.

Electoral record

References

Year of birth missing (living people)
Living people
Montreal city councillors